Petros Galaktopoulos (born 7 June 1945) is a Greek former Olympic Greco-Roman wrestler. Born in Athens, Galaktopoulos competed in five olympic tournaments from 1964 till 1976. He won two olympic medals, in the 1968 and 1972 Summer Olympics. He was named the 1968 and 1972 Greek Athlete of the Year.

Career
Galaktopoulos was born in Athens, Greece and he was member of Ethnikos G.S. Athens. During his career as a Greco-Roman wrestler, Galaktopoulos won many trophies at European and international level. At the 1964 Olympics, Galaktopoulos competed at the featherweight event and he took the 15th place. At the 1968 Olympics, he competed at the lightweight event. In seven matches, Galaktopoulos lost only to the winner of the category, Muneji Munemura and as a result he won the bronze medal. During 1972 Olympics, Galaktopoulos won the silver medal at the 74 kg class after losing to Vítězslav Mácha at the final.
Four years later, at the 1976 Summer Olympics, he was placed 8th.

References

External links
 

1945 births
Living people
Sportspeople from Athens
Olympic wrestlers of Greece
Wrestlers at the 1964 Summer Olympics
Wrestlers at the 1968 Summer Olympics
Wrestlers at the 1972 Summer Olympics
Wrestlers at the 1976 Summer Olympics
Greek male sport wrestlers
Olympic silver medalists for Greece
Olympic bronze medalists for Greece
Olympic medalists in wrestling
Medalists at the 1972 Summer Olympics
Medalists at the 1968 Summer Olympics
20th-century Greek people